Arsić is a Serbian surname, a patronymic derived from the given names Arsa and Arso (themselves diminutives of Arsenije). It may refer to:

Eustahija Arsić (1776-1843), Serbian writer
Jovica Arsić (born 1968), Serbian basketball coach
Lazar Arsić (born 1991), Serbian footballer
Petar Arsić (born 1973), Serbian former professional basketballer
Tihomir Arsić (1957–2020), Serbian actor

See also
Arsenijević
Arsenović

Serbian surnames
Patronymic surnames
Surnames from given names